Esprit Lodge & Rafting is a lodge and hostel accommodation near Fort Coulonge, a village in the Pontiac Regional County Municipality in Quebec, Canada. It is used in conjunction with whitewater rafting tours offered by the company. The main lodge was destroyed in a fire in 2016; however, the company has acquired additional accommodation options.

About the general area
Jesuit settler Father Dablon, superior of the missions of the Upper Algonkin in 1670, made note of the importance of the area with respect to the many tribes of the aboriginal Ottawa peoples who inhabited the region.

Originally, the area prospered as a logging settlement, but in the years since 1982, when the last of the log drives occurred, ecotourism and white water rafting have become the prominent attractions for travelers here. Adventure guides from Esprit Lodge lead tours of the region including the Coulonge Chutes and along the Cycloparc PPJ, a major eastern Canadian hiking and bicycle trail.

The area is rich in history with respect to the French settlement of Canada and was written about and explored by early Jesuit missionaries who noted the tradition and heritage of canoeing via the Ottawa River.

Esprit Rafting was selected as the 'second best outfitter on Earth' by National Geographic Adventure magazine.

Activities, education, certification & training
In addition to rafting trips and canoeing outfitting services provided in the region, Esprit Lodge is the only hostel accommodation in Canada offering Wilderness first aid (Kayak) and Swiftwater rescue courses and accreditation. Students from around the world travel here to learn hands-on techniques about sustainable travel through instructors and staff who encourage an adherence to the principles of Leave No Trace.

Some rivers used for training, education and exploration purposes include the Ottawa River, Petawawa, Magnetawan, Gatineau and Kipawa.

Specific levels of instruction and certification programs include: Wilderness First Responder, Whitewater Rescue Technician (WRT 1) - Level 1, Swiftwater Rescue Level 1 (SRT 1) and Level 2 (SRT 2), Riverboarding, Guide Training Level 1 and ORCA Moving water.

History
Esprit Rafting launched in 1992, having received a loan from Société d'aide au développement des collectivités (S.A.D.C.) as part of a regional effort to promote economic development in Canadian rural areas through business loans. Since that time, Esprit has become internationally known for adventure travel expeditions throughout the Ottawa River system, Chile, Costa Rica and other destinations.

The proprietors of Esprit Lodge operate several micro-philanthropy ventures in Jalcomulco, Mexico, concentrating on promoting the core values of ecotourism. Locally, the Hermanos project has resulted in the establishment of the first community Internet café, a photo business, a rafting company along with Esprit's winter operation employing local adventure guides and a museum.

Esprit Lodge has hosted numerous significant adventure races, including one of the first Raid the North adventure races in 1999, the Canadian Adventure Racing Championship in 2005, and many other events in partnership with Frontier Adventure Sports, Canada's leading adventure race provider.

Transportation
Travel to Esprit is via the provincial Quebec Route 148, the Cycloparc PPJ bicycle trail or by the Ottawa River itself.

See also
 Hostel
 Outdoor education
 Kayaking
 Rafting
 Adventure travel
 Tourism in Canada

Notes and references

External links
 
 Cycloparc PPJ
 Whitewater canoeing on the Ottawa River with Rick Mercer
 Local Waymarks

Experiential learning
Hostels in Canada